The (outdoor) men's singles competition at the 1912 Summer Olympics was part of the tennis program for the games. There were 49 competitors from 12 nations. Nations were limited to 8 players each. The event was won by Charles Winslow in an all-South African final over Harold Kitson; they were the nation's first medals in the men's singles. Oscar Kreuzer of Germany won the bronze-medal match against Bohemian Ladislav Žemla.

Background

This was the fifth appearance of the men's singles tennis. The event has been held at every Summer Olympics where tennis has been on the program: from 1896 to 1924 and then from 1988 to the current program. Demonstration events were held in 1968 and 1984. 1912 was the second and last time an indoor version was held concurrently.

The 1908 Official Report's recommendation to schedule Olympic tennis not so close to Wimbledon was not acted upon; indeed, the scheduling issue was worse in 1912. Rather than starting three days after the end of Wimbledon, the Olympic outdoor tennis events were now at the same time as Wimbledon. The indoor events, held in May, were thus attended by top-flight players, while the outdoor competitions were not.

Denmark, Norway, Russia, and Sweden each made their debut in the event. France and Germany both made their fourth appearance, tied for most among all nations.

Competition format

The competition was a single-elimination tournament with a bronze-medal match. All matches were best-of-five sets.

Schedule

The tournament was beset by withdrawals; there were 67 entries, necessitating drawing up a bracket for seven rounds, but only 49 men actually started.

Draw

Finals

Top half

Section 1

Section 2

Section 3

Section 4

Bottom half

Section 5

Section 6

Section 7

Section 8

Results summary

References

 
 
  ITF, 2008 Olympic Tennis Event Media Guide

Men's outdoor singles
Men's events at the 1912 Summer Olympics